Lootospark is a football stadium located in the town of Põlva in Põlva County in Estonia. It is the current home ground of Põlva FC Lootos and clubs women's football team Lootos.

International matches

Estonia womens national team matches

References

External links
Info at fclootos.ee 
Info at Estonian Football Association
https://www.spordiregister.ee/et/ehitis/994/jalgpallistaadion_lootospark

Football venues in Estonia
Põlva Parish
Buildings and structures in Põlva County